Melly vs. Melvin is the debut studio album by American rapper YNW Melly. It released on November 22, 2019, by 300 Entertainment and Atlantic Records. It includes the lead single "223's" featuring 9lokkNine, released on August 9, 2019. "Suicidal" received a remix, featuring late American rapper Juice Wrld, on March 13, 2020, making it the second single of the album.

Background
In an interview with Uproxx, Melly said that the album would be released in April 2019. During a phone call from prison in October 2019, Melly announced he was releasing the album soon.

On November 18, 2019, Melly's social media confirmed the release date and released the cover art. The album title is a reference to Melly's claim of having multiple personalities, two of which named Melly and Melvin. The album cover shows a juxtaposition of two faces of Melly, depicting his multiple personalities.

Critical reception

Melly vs. Melvin received mediocre reviews from music critics. Fred Thomas from AllMusic stated that "It's unclear how much of Melly Vs. Melvin was written during the rapper's murder case," however, "the uncharacteristically bright pop instrumental and pleas for forgiveness of "Waitin' on You" sound like the last-ditch effort of a lost soul seeking salvation." Thomas concludes his review by stating that, "Melly plays things relatively safe on Melly Vs. Melvin." Josh Svetz from HipHopDX wrote that, "the inconsistent, but fun project featured a mix of bright harmonies slathered in grit and soulful love-sick ballads showing glimpses of his burgeoning talent," however, he also states that, "a few high points don’t save this release from a disposable existence." Concluding his review, Svetz adds, "As it stands though, the uninspired and indistinct assembly of rough ideas ends up being a major misfire in his discography."

Despite the mediocre reviews, Evan Rytlewski from Pitchfork rated the album a 4.8/10. He stated that, "It’s a powerful concept, evoking the dueling images that the media often uses to depict young black men and suggesting how easily their portrayals can be spun. It’s a shame the idea is wasted on an album as superficial as Melly vs. Melvin, which pads Melly’s precious few original ideas with second-rate material and third-rate Young Thug-isms." He continues his review by noting that, "Melly’s contrition isn’t especially convincing, however, nor is he effective at engendering sympathy." Rytlewski concluded his review by stating that, "Melly distinguished himself from his many SoundCloud variants with a ’90s R&B influence," however he states that, "Melvin is the best music he had left in the vault, that doesn’t bode well for his prospects, either."

Commercial performance
Melly vs. Melvin debuted at number eight on the US Billboard 200 on December 7, 2019, with 43,000 album-equivalent units. It is YNW Melly's highest-peaking album thus far.

Track listing

Sample credits
 "Bang Bang" contains a sample of "Body On Me" as performed by Nelly, written by Cornell Haynes, Jr., Akon, Ashanti and Giorgio Tuinfort.
"Waitin on You" contains a sample of "Human Nature" as performed by Michael Jackson, written by Steve Porcaro and John Bettis.

Charts

Weekly charts

Year-end charts

Certifications

References

2019 albums
YNW Melly albums